The Cornul (also: Urmuroasa, Cernădia) is a left tributary of the river Șușița in Romania. It flows into the Șușița in Bârsești.

References

Rivers of Romania
Rivers of Gorj County